The Diriyah ePrix is a race of the single-seater, electrically powered Formula E championship, held in Diriyah, Saudi Arabia. It was first held as part of the 2018–19 season and was the first Formula E race to be held in the Middle East. The second Diriyah ePrix was held on 22 and 23 November 2019.

History 
As a part of Saudi Arabia's long-term plan to hold international sports events, the General Sports Authority along with Saudi Arabian Motor Federation made a ten-year agreement to hold a Formula E ePrix in Saudi Arabia.

The 2018 Saudia Ad Diriyah ePrix was held during the day in December of 2018 as the first race of Gen 2 of Formula E and Season 5 of ABB Formula E. BMW’s Antonio Felix Da Costa took pole position and went on to win the race in BMW’s first Formula E Race

In 2019 the Saudia Diriyah ePrix was held as a ‘double-header’ meaning two races were held on the same weekend. Winners from the last Diriyah ePrix BMW i Andretti Autosport took pole position again this time with Alexander Sims but in the race the British driver didn’t manage to convert pole to a win and the race was won by Sam Bird from Envision-Virgin. In the second race Sims took pole again but this time managed to win a lights-to-flag victory on the streets of Diriyah for Andretti.

For the 2021 Diriyah E-Prix the race was held as a ‘night-race’ meaning the race was held after sunset and the track was lined with lights above the circuit. Nyck de Vries took pole in his Mercedes-EQ and in the race he managed to lead every lap to win his first Formula E race. Robin Frijns took pole in the second race but the lead changed eight times and eventually Frijns’ old teammate Sam Bird won the race for Jaguar after the race was ended early due to a crash towards the end of the race.

Formula E returned to Diriyah once again for the 2022 Diriyah E-Prix and in the first race Stoffel Vandoorne qualified on pole in the new qualification system for Season 8. His Mercedes EQ teammate Nyck de Vries climbed up from 3rd place to eventually lead a Mercedes 1-2 in the third Formula E night race. In the second race de Vries qualified on pole but it was Mercedes customer team ROKIT Venturi who won the race.

In 2023 the CORE Diriyah E-Prix was held for the first time as rounds 2 and 3 after the new season and new Gen 3 era had started in Mexico City. Envison’s Sebastien Buemi took pole for the first race but in the race championship leader Jake Dennis climbed up the order to second place from P11 and Pascal Wehrlein from 9th won the race and took Porsche’s second Formula E win. In the second race rookie Jake Hughes took his, and McLaren’s first pole but didn’t manage to keep the lead in the race and eventually Pascal Wehrlein won again becoming the fifth driver to win two races on the same venue on the same weekend and Jake Dennis also finished second again in his Porsche powered Andretti.

Circuit 

The race is held at the Riyadh Street Circuit in Diriyah, a town in Saudi Arabia located on the north-western outskirts of the capital, Riyadh. This configuration was used for the 2018 and 2019 editions of the ePrix, with minor modifications being made for the 2021 edition.

Results

Repeat winners (drivers)

References 

 
Formula E ePrix
Recurring sporting events established in 2018
2018 establishments in Saudi Arabia